Dapto railway station is located on the South Coast railway line in the Wollongong suburb of Dapto, New South Wales, Australia.

History 
The railway from Clifton to North Kiama, opened in 1887, continued through the sparsely-settled rural district of Dapto. Although the station was built some distance south of the existing village centre (that area, now called Brownsville, was considered too swampy) the platform building was significantly larger than any other south of Wollongong – of a scale usually reserved for medium-sized country towns. The commercial centre of Dapto duly migrated south to be nearer the station.

The approach to the platform building from Station Street is via a circular driveway through Hartigan Park, planted with brush box and Canary Island date palm. (Today, the park also contains Korean and Vietnam war memorials.)

Entry is via a gabled entry porch flanked by small verandahs. The building is made of weatherboard, with a complex, gabled roof clad in corrugated steel.  The building was renovated in the 1920s and again in 1970. The original toilet block was replaced with the current blond-brick structure in 1971.

Dapto served as the interchange point between diesel multiple units to Bomaderry and electric multiple units to Wollongong and Sydney from 1993 until the Kiama electrification in 2001. To accommodate the interchange, a new platform 1 was built on the western side of the station, and a new dock platform (3) was added to the northern end of the main platform, which was renumbered platform 2. Access between platforms 1 and 2 is via the Bong Bong Road level crossing on the southern end of the platforms. Additional minor upgrades were completed in 2013 and 2014.

In 2014, electronic ticketing in the form of the Opal smart card became available at the station.

In 2014, the railway station was featured in the first episode of an online animated series called Damo and Darren where the two main characters argue over a lighter.

Platforms & services
Dapto has two side platforms and one dock platform. It is serviced by NSW TrainLink South Coast line services travelling between Sydney Central, Bondi Junction and Kiama.

Transport links
Premier Illawarra operates five routes via Dapto station:
31: Wollongong to Horsley
33: to Wollongong
37: Wollongong Beach to Wollongong station via Oak Flats & Shellharbour anti-clockwise loop
41: to University of Wollongong
57: Wollongong station to Wollongong Beach via Shellharbour & Oak Flats clockwise loop

Dapto is also served by one NSW TrainLink coach service between Wollongong and Bundanoon.

References

External links

Dapto station details Transport for New South Wales

Buildings and structures in Wollongong
Railway stations in Australia opened in 1887
Regional railway stations in New South Wales